Victorelloidea is a superfamily of bryozoans belonging to the order Ctenostomatida. It is the only superfamily in its monotypic suborder, Victorellina.

The following families are accepted within the superfamily, according to the World Register of Marine Species:

 Aethozoidae d'Hondt, 1983
 Immergentiidae Silén, 1946
 Nolellidae Harmer, 1915
 Sundanellidae Jebram, 1973
 Victorellidae Hincks, 1880

References

Ctenostomatida